Pietro Anderloni (12 October 1784 – 13 October 1849) was an Italian engraver of the 19th century.

Biography
He first trained under his brother Faustino Anderloni, but then worked under Giuseppe Longhi. He was prolific in engraving  reproductions of classic works of the Renaissance, including the Vatican frescoes of Raphael. In 1831, he succeeded Longhi as professor of engraving in Milan.

He was elected a fourth class, corresponding member living abroad, of the Royal Institute of the Netherlands in 1835.

External links 
Engravings at Harvard Museum.

References

Italian engravers
Academic staff of Brera Academy
1784 births
1849 deaths
Members of the Royal Netherlands Academy of Arts and Sciences